Tina is a village just south of Taba near the northwest coast of Guadalcanal, Solomon Islands.

References

Populated places in Guadalcanal Province